Gabriel Mendez (born 12 March 1973) is a former Australian association football player.

An attacking midfielder, the much-travelled Mendez is a former player of Admira Wacker and Notts County in Europe and for Malaysian side Kedah FA. He is also a former Australia national football team player from 1994 to 2000.

An unexpected playing return with St Columba's Castle Hill in 2013 ended prematurely, with a hamstring injury curtailing an initially bright performance.

His daughter Seone Mendez is a tennis player and his son Gian Mendez is a professional footballer.

External links 
 

1973 births
Living people
Footballers from Buenos Aires
Argentine emigrants to Australia
Argentine footballers
Australian soccer players
Australian expatriate soccer players
Australia international soccer players
Expatriate footballers in Malaysia
National Soccer League (Australia) players
Blacktown City FC players
Marconi Stallions FC players
Notts County F.C. players
Parramatta Power players
Sydney Olympic FC players
Sydney United 58 FC players
FC Admira Wacker Mödling players
Parramatta FC players
Association football midfielders
Australian people of Argentine descent